Charles Brainard Taylor Moore (1853 – April 4, 1923) was a Rear Admiral in the United States Navy and Naval Governor of American Samoa from 1905 to 1908.

Taylor was born in Decatur, Illinois. He graduated from the Naval Academy in 1873.

He died at the Philadelphia Naval Hospital, on April 4, 1923.

References

1853 births
1923 deaths
United States Navy admirals
Governors of American Samoa
United States Naval Academy alumni